Burke Murphy (born June 5, 1973) is a Canadian retired professional ice hockey player. He was selected by the Calgary Flames in the 11th round (278th overall) of the 1993 NHL Entry Draft.

Murphy played college hockey with St. Lawrence University, and in his final year of play with the St. Lawrence Saints men's ice hockey team (1995–96) Murphy was the recognized as the runner up for Hockey East's Player of the Year.

Career statistics

Awards and honours

References

External links

1973 births
Living people
Calgary Flames draft picks
Canadian ice hockey right wingers
Cleveland Lumberjacks players
Heilbronner EC players
Ice hockey people from Ottawa
Nepean Raiders players
Quebec Rafales players
Revier Löwen players
Saint John Flames players
Wipptal Broncos players
St. Lawrence Saints men's ice hockey players
Straubing Tigers players
AHCA Division I men's ice hockey All-Americans